is a Japanese figure skater. She is the 2019–20 Japanese national bronze medalist. She has represented Japan at two World Junior Championships.

Career

Early years 
Kawabata began learning to skate in 2008. Making her junior debut, she placed 15th at the 2015 Japan Championships. She competed as a senior at the 2018 Japan Championships and finished in 21st place. In January 2018, she won gold in the junior ladies' category at the Bavarian Open.

2018–2019 season 
Kawabata received two 2018–19 Junior Grand Prix (JGP) assignments. She placed fifth in the short program, sixth in the free skate, and fifth overall at JGP Slovakia, held in Bratislava, Slovakia, and had the same final result at JGP Slovenia held in Ljubljana, Slovenia.

She finished twelfth at the 2019 World Junior Championships. She was coached by former ice dancer Nakako Tsuzuki in Yokohama and Kanawaga.

2019–2020 season 
Kawabata made a coaching change in July 2019, joining Yukina Ota and Yutaka Higuchi at the Meiji Jingu rink in Tokyo. She again placed fifth at both of her JGP assignments. At the Japan Championships, she won silver in the junior event and then bronze in the senior event.

Finishing the season at the 2020 World Junior Championships, Kawabata placed fourteenth.

2020–2021 season 
Kawabata was invited to compete at the Japan Open as part of Team Red.  She subsequently placed fifth at the domestic Eastern Sectionals Championship to qualify to the national championships.  Kawabata made her senior debut on the Grand Prix at the 2020 NHK Trophy, where she was tenth.  She placed eleventh at the 2020–21 Japan Championships.

Programs

Competitive highlights 
GP: Grand Prix; CS: Challenger Series; JGP: Junior Grand Prix

Detailed results 
Small medals for short and free programs awarded only at ISU Championships.

Senior results

Junior results

References

External links 

 

2002 births
Living people
Japanese female single skaters
People from Nisshin, Aichi
Sportspeople from Aichi Prefecture